Emzarios Bentinidis (born Emzar Bedineishvili on August 16, 1975 in Tbilisi) is a male freestyle wrestler from Georgia. He represented Georgia at the 2000 Summer Olympics and Greece in the 2004 Summer Olympics. Representing Greece, he also participated in Men's freestyle 74 kg at 2008 Summer Olympics. He lost in the quarterfinal to Soslan Tigiev from Uzbekistan.

He won a bronze medal at 2008 European Wrestling Championships. He is currently the coach of India wrestler Bajrang Punia who won a bronze medal at Tokyo 2020.

References

External links
 Wrestler bio on beijing2008.com
 

Male sport wrestlers from Georgia (country)
Olympic wrestlers of Georgia (country)
Olympic wrestlers of Greece
Wrestlers at the 2000 Summer Olympics
Greek male sport wrestlers
Wrestlers at the 2004 Summer Olympics
Wrestlers at the 2008 Summer Olympics
1975 births
Living people
Sportspeople from Tbilisi
Georgian emigrants to Greece
European champions for Greece
European Wrestling Championships medalists